Sam Querrey was the defending champion but decided not to participate.

In the final, Ernests Gulbis defeated Mardy Fish in a close match, 5–7, 6–4, 6–4, becoming the first unseeded player to win this tournament since Radek Štěpánek in 2007.

Seeds
The first four seeds received a bye into the second round.

Qualifying

Draw

Finals

Top half

Bottom half

External links
 Main draw
 Qualifying draw

Farmers Classic - Singles
2011 Singles